Monica Seles was the defending champion, but didn't play for the remainder of this season after being stabbed in the back in Hamburg.

Martina Navratilova won the title by defeating Zina Garrison-Jackson 6–2, 7–6(7–1) in the final.

Seeds
The first four seeds receive a bye into the second round.

Draw

Finals

Top half

Bottom half

References

External links
 Official results archive (ITF)
 Official results archive (WTA)

Singles
Bank of the West Classic